The 1848 United States presidential election in Mississippi took place on November 7, 1848, as part of the 1848 United States presidential election. Voters chose six representatives, or electors to the Electoral College, who voted for President and Vice President.

Mississippi voted for the Democratic candidate, Lewis Cass, over Whig candidate Zachary Taylor. Cass won Mississippi by a margin of 1.2%.

Results

References

Mississippi
1848
1848 Mississippi elections